Kevin Mark Holness (born 11 November 1980), better known as Mighty Mystic, is a Jamaican-born, Somerville, Massachusetts-based reggae artist. He is the younger brother to current Jamaican Prime Minister Andrew Holness.

Born in St Elizabeth, Jamaica, he moved to Boston at the age of nine with his family. He began performing as 'Mystic' and broke through with his 2006 single "Riding on the Clouds", which received radio airplay across the East coast of the US. His debut album Wake up the World (2010) included "Revolution", "Riding on the Clouds", "Original Love", and "Slipped Away", with appearances from Shaggy and roots rocker Lutan Fyah.

Discography

Albums
 Giant (2022)
 Wake up the World (2010)
 Concrete World (2014)
 The Art of Balance (2016)
 enter the mystic (2019)

EPs
 Wake up the World EP (2010)

Singles

 "Riding on the Clouds" (2006)
 "Revolution" (2008)
 "Here I Am" (w/ Shaggy (2008) 
 "Slipped Away" (2009)
 "I Alone" (2010)
 "Rems Up" (w/ Lutan Fyah) (2010)
 "Original Love" (2011)
 "Concrete World" (2013)
 "Cali Green" (2014)
 "War (Rumors of War" (2014)
 "True Love" (2014)
 "Happy" (2014)
 "Something Bout Mary" (2016)
 "How I Rock" (2016)

Television
 WCSH Channel 6

References

Sources
 https://web.archive.org/web/20160409192348/http://m.jamaicaobserver.com/mobile/entertainment/Mighty-Mystic-s-work-of-art_55584(2016)
 https://topshelfreggae.com/reviews/mighty-mystic-the-art-of-balance-album-review (2016)
 http://www.metro.us/entertainment/mighty-mystic-says-boston-is-a-bigger-reggae-town-than-you-realize/zsJobd---zV4fwmeac1YVY/ (2015)
 http://www.thepier.org/mighty-mystic-to-release-new-record/ (2015)
 http://www.metro.us/entertainment/mighty-mystic-says-boston-is-a-bigger-reggae-town-than-you-realize/zsJobd---zV4fwmeac1YVY/ (2015)
 http://reggaearoundtheworld.wordpress.com/2013/05/18/healing-boston-with-reggaes-remedy-our-interview-with-mighty-mystic/ Reggae Around The World (2013)
a* http://jamaica-gleaner.com/gleaner/20130519/ent/ent2.html (2013)
 http://www.reggaeville.com/nc/artist-details/artist/mighty-mystic/ac/artistReleases.html (2014)
 http://www.mtviggy.com/videos/mighty-mystic-concrete-world/ MTV – MTV Iggy
 http://mixturemagazine.wordpress.com/2012/11/04/reggae-artist-mighty-mystic/  Mixture Magazine
 http://www.reggaemovement.com/Artists/Mighty-Mystic  Reggae Movement:

External links
 

1980 births
Living people
people from Saint Elizabeth Parish
Jamaican male singers
Jamaican reggae singers